NA-118 Lahore -II is a constituency for the National Assembly of Pakistan. The constituency includes the walled city of Lahore.

Members of Parliament

2018-2022: NA-124 Lahore-II

Election 2002 

General elections were held on 10 Oct 2002. Khawaja Saad Rafique of PML-N won by 43,166 votes.

All Candidates gaining over 1,000 votes are listed here.
75,965

|}

Election 2008 

General elections were held on 18 Feb 2008. Hamza Shahbaz Sharif of PML-N won the seat.

Election 2013 

General elections were held on 11 May 2013. Hamza Shahbaz Sharif of PML-N won by 107,735 votes and became a member of the National Assembly.

Election 2018 

General elections were scheduled to be held on 25 July 2018. Hamza Shehbaz Sharif of Pakistan Muslim League (N) won the election but vacated this constituency in favor of membership in the Punjab Assembly.

By-election 2018

By-elections were held in this constituency on 14 October 2018.

See also
NA-117 Lahore-I
NA-119 Lahore-III

References

External links 
 Election result's official website

NA-119